Jacob Erlandson (born March 14, 1999) is an American professional soccer player who plays as a defender for Columbus Crew 2 in MLS Next Pro.

Early years

Youth 
Born in Akron, Ohio, Erlandson grew up in Dayton, Ohio, attending Dayton Christian High School. Erlandson also played club soccer at Ohio Galaxies until 2017. He was a four-year letterwinner at Dayton Christian, a two-time All-Ohio First-Team selection who was also named an All-American as a senior, and scored a career total of 97 goals and tallied 56 assists in his two-year career. He was named the Metro Buckeye League Player of the Year in both seasons, and also was named the Miami Valley Area P-O-Y in each of those two years.

College & Amateur 
In 2017, Erlandson attended Huntington University to play college soccer. In three seasons with the Foresters, Erlandson scored 21 goals whilst alternating as a defender and a forward. He earned honors including All-CL Second Team in 2017 and 2018, and in 2019 was a NAIA All American, the Crossroads League Defender of the Year, and  all-league first team for the third consecutive time. In 2020, Erlandson transferred to Bowling Green State University, where he scored nine goals and added six assists in 32 appearances for the Falcons, gaining All-MAC First Team honors in his first season. In his final season, he was again named an All-MAC First Team, as well as being on the MAC's All-Tournament Team, the United Soccer Coaches All-North Region First-Team, OCSA All-Ohio First Team, and was also named as BGSU's Male Athlete of the Year.

While at college, Erlandson also appeared in the USL League Two with Dayton Dutch Lions in 2019, and again with Flint City Bucks during their 2021 season, where he bagged five goals for the team during the regular season.

Club career

Columbus Crew 2
On January 11, 2022, Erlandson was selected 40th overall in the 2022 MLS SuperDraft by Columbus Crew. He signed with the club's MLS Next Pro side Columbus Crew 2 on March 17, 2022. During their inaugural season, he made three regular season appearances as the team won the MLS Next Pro Regular Season and MLS Next Pro Eastern Conference titles.

Honors

Club
Columbus Crew 2
MLS Next Pro: 2022 Regular season champions
MLS Next Pro: 2022 Eastern Conference winners

References

External links 
 Jacob Erlandson MLS bio
 

1999 births
Living people
American soccer players
Association football defenders
Bowling Green Falcons men's soccer players
Columbus Crew draft picks
Columbus Crew 2 players
Dayton Dutch Lions players
Flint City Bucks players
MLS Next Pro players
Soccer players from Ohio
Sportspeople from Dayton, Ohio
USL League Two players